Melanie H. Buckley (born 31 July 1982) is an English chess player, British Women's Chess Championship winner (2001).

Biography
In 1996, Melanie Buckley won British Girl's Chess Championship in U15 age group. In 2001, in Scarborough she won British Women's Chess Championship.

Melanie Buckley played for England in the Women's Chess Olympiad:
 In 2004, at first reserve board in the 36th Chess Olympiad (women) in Calvià (+2, =2, -1).

Since 2007, she has rarely participated in chess tournaments.

References

External links

Melanie Buckley chess games at 365Chess.com

1982 births
English female chess players
Chess Olympiad competitors
Living people